The Shah Abbasi Caravansarai of Nishapur is a historical caravanserai built by the Safavid Empire  and is located in the central part of the city of Nishapur. This caravansary was built by the order of the Abbas the Great, the Safavid Shah of Persia. This caravanserai is in the list of the national heritage of Iran. This caravanserai is now used as a tourist attraction and there are also several handicraft shops and two museums inside of it. This caravanserai is within Iran's National Heritage list with the registration number of 1230.

Gallery

References 

Caravanserais in Iran